Albert Hoffa (31 March 1859 – 31 December 1907) was a German surgeon, orthopedist and physiotherapist born in Richmond, Cape of Good Hope.

He studied medicine at the Universities of Marburg and Freiburg, earning his doctorate with a thesis on nephritis saturnina. In 1886, he opened a private clinic for orthopedics, physiotherapy and massage in Würzburg, where in 1895 he became an associate professor at the university. In 1902 he succeeded Julius Wolff (1836-1902) at the department of orthopedics in Berlin.

Hoffa is remembered for introducing an operation for congenital hip dislocations (1890), as well as for development of a system of massage therapy (Hoffa system). His name is associated with a condition known as "Hoffa's fat pad disease", being characterized by chronic knee pain primarily beneath the patella.

In 1892 he founded the journal Zeitschrift für orthopädische Chirurgie.

Selected writings 
 Lehrbuch der Fracturen und Luxationen für Ärzte und Studierende, 1888 - Textbook of fractures and luxations for physicians and students.
 Lehrbuch der orthopädischen Chirurgie, 1891 - Textbook of orthopedic surgery.
 Technik der Massage, 1893 - Technique of massage.
 Atlas und Grundriss der Verbandlehre, 1897 - Atlas and outline of the teaching association.
 Die orthopädische Literatur, 1905 - Orthopedic literature.

See also 

 Hoffa fracture
 Busch-Hoffa fracture

References 

German orthopedic surgeons
University of Freiburg alumni
University of Marburg alumni
1907 deaths
1859 births
Academic staff of the University of Würzburg
German physiotherapists